Mou Forest is a protected forest in Burkina Faso. 
It is located in Tuy Province.

Protected areas of Burkina Faso
Tuy Province